

 
Anmatjere is a locality in the Northern Territory of Australia located about  south of the territory capital of Darwin.

History
The locality was named after the former Anmatjere Community Government Council, whose seat was located in the town of Ti-Tree.  Its boundaries and name were gazetted on 4 April 2007.

Governance and demographics
Anmatjere is located within the federal division of Lingiari, the territory electoral division of Stuart and the local government areas of the Barkly Shire and the Central Desert Region.

The 2016 Australian census reports that Anmatjere had 477 people living within its boundaries, of whom 47.3% were male, 52.7% were female and 87.9% identified as Aboriginal and/or Torres Strait Islander people.

Sites and attractions
The following sites located within Anmatjere are listed on the Northern Territory Heritage Register:
 Aileron Homestead No. 1
 Alcoota Fossil Beds
Anna's Reservoir Conservation Reserve
Old Mount Riddock Homestead – Gemtree
Ryan Well Historical Reserve

The homestead of Woodgreen Station, also known as Atartinga, is situated within Anmatjere.

Mount Skinner, a mountain, is within Anmatjere. The Ediacaran-aged fossil known as Skinnera is named for its discovery at from three sites near Mount Skinner. The property was established in 1952 by John "Jock" Nelson, a Labor MP who served in the Australian House of Representatives for 17 years. The Nelson and Barber families held the pastoral lease on the property until 2019, when a South Australian family acquired the station. At that time it had around 2,500 Poll Hereford cattle.

, anthropologists' work is continuing on both Woodgreen and Mount Skinner pastoral leases as the basis for any future native title claims, under the auspices of the Central Land Council.

Two sculptures, Anmatjere Man and Anmatjere Woman and Child, are located at the Aileron roadhouse.

Footnotes

References

Populated places in the Northern Territory
Central Desert Region